We the Collective is the eleventh studio album by folk-punk rock band the Levellers. The album entered the British album charts at number 12, the band's highest charting entry in over 21 years. The 10-track album features acoustic re-recordings of many of the band's greatest hits, with two new songs "Shame" and "Drug Bust McGee".

The album was produced by John Leckie.

Track listing
 "Exodus"
 "Liberty Song"
 "England My Home"
 "Subvert"
 "Hope Street"
 "Elation"
 "Dance Before the Storm"
 "The Shame"
 "Drug Bust McGee"
 "One Way"

The deluxe edition included four additional tracks:
 "Fifteen Years"
 "Outside Inside"
 "All the Unknown"
 "Said and Done"

Personnel

Musicians
 Mark Chadwick - guitars, vocals
 Charlie Heather - drums/percussion
 Jeremy Cunningham - bass guitar, artwork
 Simon Friend - guitars, vocals, mandolin
 Jonathan Sevink - fiddle
 Matt Savage - keyboard
 Moulettes - cello, percussion, violin, viola, vocals
 Laura Kidd - guest vocals

References 

Levellers (band) albums
2018 albums
albums produced by John Leckie